Chucho el roto, is a Mexican telenovela produced by Televisa and originally transmitted by Telesistema Mexicano.

Cast 
Manuel López Ochoa
Blanca Sánchez
Luciano Hernández de la Vega
Susana Alexander
Arturo Benavides
Freddy Fernández
María Eugenia Ríos
Alicia Montoya

References

External links 

Mexican telenovelas
Televisa telenovelas
Spanish-language telenovelas
1968 telenovelas
1968 Mexican television series debuts
1968 Mexican television series endings